Anthony Wolfe CM (born 23 December 1983) is a Trinidadian professional footballer who plays as a forward. He represented the Trinidad and Tobago national team on 35 occasions.

As a member of the squad that competed at the 2006 FIFA World Cup in Germany, he was awarded the Chaconia Medal (Gold Class), the second highest state decoration of Trinidad and Tobago.

Club career
Wolfe started his career at North East Stars, with whom he clinched the league title in 2004, scoring eight goals for them in the process. He then moved to San Juan Jabloteh at the start of the 2006 season and became that seasons's joint-top goalscorer with 16 goals, which earned him a move to the Atlanta Silverbacks in the USL First Division. He only played three games for them, scoring one goal, in his lone season.

Wolfe first came to India in 2014 and joined I-League side Churchill Brothers for a season. He made his debut in the on 11 February 2014 against Rangdajied United at the Tilak Maidan Stadium, in which he scored the only goal. He again played for the Goan-side for a season in 2017. He also played for Sporting Clube de Goa, another I-League club. In 2017, he moved to Tollygunge Agragami on loan transfer from Churchill and appeared in Calcutta Football League matches.

Wolfe has appeared with Indian club Peerless SC in the Calcutta Premier Division and has had two spells with the club. In 2019, Peerless created history after winning the 2019–20 Calcutta Premier Division, defeating their archrivals; three Kolkata giants and he was in the title winning squad.

International career
Wolfe was considered a surprise inclusion in the Trinidad and Tobago national team for the 2006 FIFA World Cup.

He represented Trinidad and Tobago 35 times, making his debut on 29 January 2003, against Finland in a 2–1 defeat.

International goals
Scores and results list Trinidad and Tobago's goal tally first, score column indicates score after each Wolfe goal.

Honours
North East Stars
TT Pro League: 2004

Central
Trinidad and Tobago FA Trophy: runner-up 2012–13

Peerless
Calcutta Football League: 2019

Individual
Topscorer of TT Pro League: 2006 (with 16 goals)
 Chaconia Medal Gold Class: 2006

See also
 List of Chaconia Medal recipients

References

External links
 Anthony Wolfe at Socawarriors.net
 
 
 
 

Living people
1983 births
Trinidad and Tobago footballers
People from Sangre Grande region
Association football forwards
North East Stars F.C. players
San Juan Jabloteh F.C. players
Atlanta Silverbacks players
Ma Pau Stars S.C. players
Central F.C. players
Churchill Brothers FC Goa players
Sporting Clube de Goa players
Tollygunge Agragami FC players
Peerless SC players
TT Pro League players
USL First Division players
I-League players
Calcutta Football League players
Trinidad and Tobago international footballers
2006 FIFA World Cup players
Trinidad and Tobago expatriate footballers
Expatriate soccer players in the United States
Trinidad and Tobago expatriate sportspeople in the United States
Expatriate footballers in India
Trinidad and Tobago expatriate sportspeople in India
Recipients of the Chaconia Medal